The Socket FP2 or μBGA-827 is a CPU socket for notebooks that was released in May 2012 by AMD with its APU processors codenamed Trinity and Richland.

"Trinity"-branded products combine Piledriver with Northern Islands (VLIW4 TeraScale), UVD 3 and VCE 1 video acceleration and AMD Eyefinity-based multi-monitor support of up to two non-DisplayPort- or up to four DisplayPort monitors.

Feature overview for AMD APUs

See also
 List of AMD processors with 3D graphics
 List of AMD mobile microprocessors

External links

 Socket FS1 Design Specification

AMD mobile sockets